Jason William Barnet Pizzo is an American attorney and politician who served as a member of the Florida Senate for the 38th district from 2018 to 2022. Prior to his election, Pizzo was an Assistant State Attorney, with the Miami Dade State Attorney's Office.

Career
Pizzo first ran for the State Senate against Daphne Campbell, in the Democratic primary Pizzo won 24% behind Campbell with 31%. Pizzo then in 2018 ran again and in the primary received 54% to Campbell's 46%. Pizzo was elected to the Florida legislature on November 6, 2018, running unopposed. In 2022, Pizzo predicted that "nothing is going to happen" in regard to taking away Disney's legal privileges enshrined in the Reedy Creek Improvement Act and opposed the repeal of the law.

Elections

References

Democratic Party Florida state senators
Living people
People from North Miami Beach, Florida
New York University alumni
Columbia Graduate School of Architecture, Planning and Preservation alumni
University of Miami School of Law alumni
Politicians from Somerville, New Jersey
21st-century American politicians
1976 births